Wilfred Whitfield (17 November 1916 – 18 February 1995) was an English professional footballer who played in the Football League for Torquay United and Bristol Rovers as a left half.

Personal life 
Whitfield served as a corporal in the British Army during the Second World War.

References 

English Football League players
English footballers
Clapton Orient F.C. wartime guest players
Association football wing halves
Footballers from Chesterfield
1916 births
1995 deaths
Birtley F.C. players
Worksop Town F.C. players
Bristol Rovers F.C. players
Torquay United F.C. players
Bath City F.C. players
Queens Park Rangers F.C. wartime guest players
British Army personnel of World War II
Royal Artillery soldiers